Edwin Franden Dakin (1898–1976) was an American advertising executive and author who wrote a critical biography of Mary Baker Eddy.

Biography

Dakin was associate editor of the weekly magazine Commerce and Finance  (1922-1926). He also edited the magazine Plane Talk. He is best known for his book Mrs. Eddy: The Biography of a Virginal Mind, a critical biography of Mary Baker Eddy. It was the first biography to document Eddy's use of morphine. It received positive reviews in academic journals.

In 1929, H. L. Mencken commented that Dakin "has been at pains to unearth the precise facts and he sets them forth carefully and pleasantly. The Christian Science press-agents, of course, will damn him as a slanderer, but that fact is unimportant. He has made a valuable contribution to American history."

The Dictionary of American Biography described it as  the "most impartial and scholarly biography" of Eddy. It has also been described it as "a superbly documented biography." Psychiatrist Karl Menninger described the book as "remarkable". Ernest Sutherland Bates praised the book for its judicious examination of sources.

Literary critic Daniel Burt wrote that it is a detailed biography and Dakin achieved an "objectivity rare in books about Eddy."

Controversy

When Dakin's biography of Mary Baker Eddy was published in 1929, Christian Science officials from the Mother Church tried to censor and suppress the book.

Christian Scientists complained that the biography was biased and negative towards Eddy. The Mother Church threatened a number of bookstores that were selling it with foreclosure of mortgages. John Hall Wheelock noted that an officer from the First Church of Christ Scientist threatened its publisher Charles Scribner's Sons with "malicious animal magnetism".

Christian Scientists threatened to boycott stores that displayed the book for sale. They were unsuccessful and Dakin's biography was republished by Scribner's in 1930. It was issued with a pamphlet that documented the attempted suppression, The Blight that Failed.

William J. Whalen has noted that the Christian Science attempts of censorship "backfired and turned the book into a best seller".

Cycles: The Science of Prediction
In 1947, Dakin along with Edward R. Dewey, published the book Cycles: The Science of Prediction which argued the United States economy was driven by four cycles of different length. Robert Gale Woolbert
wrote that they "adduce interesting second-hand statistics to the effect that cyclical tendencies have been observed in industrial, biological and solar phenomena." Milton Friedman dismissed their theory as pseudoscience saying:
[Cycles: The Science of Prediction] is not a scientific book: the evidence underlying the stated conclusions is not presented in full; data graphed are not identified so that someone else could reproduce them; the techniques employed are nowhere described in detail. [...] Its closest analogue is the modern high-power advertisement—here of book length and designed to sell an esoteric and supposedly scientific product. Like most modern advertising, the book seeks to sell its product by making exaggerated claims for it [...], showing it in association with other valued objects which really don't have anything to do with it [...], keeping discreetly silent about its defeats or mentioning them in only the vaguest form [...], and citing authorities who think highly of the product.

Publications
Mrs. Eddy: The Biography of a Virginal Mind (1929)
Cycles: The Science of Prediction (1947) [with Edward R. Dewey]

References

External links
Mrs. Eddy, by Edwin Franden Dakin. The Stanford Daily, Volume 76, Issue 48, 9 December 1929.
The Press: Scientific Censorship. Time, 16 December 1929.

1898 births
1976 deaths
American advertising executives
20th-century American biographers
American magazine editors
Critics of Christian Science
Writers from Missouri